Ariastes is a genus of beetles in the family Cerambycidae, containing the following species:

 Ariastes monostigma Fairmaire, 1896
 Ariastes muellerae Vives, 2003

References

Dorcasominae